Sven Erik Martinsson (born 22 September 1935) is a retired Swedish bobsledder. He competed in the four-man event at the 1968 Winter Olympics and finished 16th.

References

1968 births
Living people
Bobsledders at the 1968 Winter Olympics
Olympic bobsledders of Sweden
Swedish male bobsledders